Sabanchi (Habansı) is a rural locality (a village) in Istyaksky Selsoviet, Yanaulsky District, Bashkortostan, Russia. The population was 7 as of 2010. There is 1 street.

Geography 
Sabanchi is located 10 km southeast of Yanaul (the district's administrative centre) by road. Akhtiyal is the nearest rural locality.

References 

Rural localities in Yanaulsky District